Central Heating was the second compilation released by Grand Central Records. The two disc album was originally released in November 1996. It was re-released in February 2004 with alternative sleeve art.

Disc one
 "Central Introduction" - Tony D
 "How Sweet It Is" - Mr. Scruff & Mark Rae
 "Spellbound (featuring Veba" - Rae & Christian
 "Second Street Gogo" - Tony D
 "Hand Of Doom (featuring Clita Johnrose)" - Andy Votel
 "Through These Veins (featuring Afu Ra)" - Funky Fresh Few
 "Pourquoi (featuring Buffy Brox)" - Only Child
 "Good Advice" - Rae & Christian
 "Rain (featuring Buffy Brox)" - Only Child
 "It's Time Two (featuring Chubby Grooves)" - Tony D

Disc two
 "Original Stuntmaster" - Aim
 "Hemlock'd" - Andy Votel
 "You Mean Fantastic" - Funky Fresh Few
 "Loopdreams" - Aim
 "When We Get Together" - Tony D
 "Gotta Have Her" - Mr. Scruff & Mark Rae
 "Lunagroove" - Only Child
 "Baseball Fury" - Rae & Christian
 "Spooky Driver" - Andy Votel
 "Souldive (All City mix)" - Aim
 "Northern Sulphuric Soul"  - Rae & Christian

See also
 Grand Central Records compilations

2004 compilation albums
Grand Central Records compilation albums
Hip hop compilation albums
Electronica compilation albums